Kirstie Alley's Big Life is an American reality television series on A&E that debuted March 21, 2010. The series chronicles the life of Kirstie Alley as she works to lose weight, launch a weight loss program and be a single mother. The series was distributed and aired on A&E prior to the series being shifted to Lifetime. Alley was the star of the show, but not the heaviest person on the show. Alley ended up losing most of the weight she had hoped to eliminate while
following the diet that she had created.

Cast
 Kirstie Alley (228 lbs.)
 Jim — Kirstie's handyman (324 lbs.)
 Lillie — Kirstie's daughter
 True —  Kirstie's son
 Kyle — Kirstie's assistant
 Tracy — Kirstie's stylist
 Kelly — Kirstie's executive assistant

Episodes

References

External links

2010s American reality television series
2010 American television series debuts
2010 American television series endings
English-language television shows
A&E (TV network) original programming
Television series by Fremantle (company)